WKND (Weekend) is an electronic dance music album released by Ferry Corsten digitally on 21 February 2012, and physically in the Netherlands on 24 February, in the UK on 27 February and in the US on 27 March. It is his fourth studio album released under his own name.

Track listing

Charts

See also 
 Ferry Corsten discography

References

External links 
 WKND at Discogs
 

2012 albums
Ferry Corsten albums